Kajjansi Airfield  is an airfield serving Kajjansi, a town in the Central Region of Uganda.

Location
The geographical location of the airfield are:0°12'01.0"N, 32°33'00.0"E (Latitude:0.200278; Longitude:32.550000). Kajjansi is located in the southern portion of the Kampala conurbation. The runway is east of the Kampala–Entebbe Road, bordering marshland near the shore of Lake Victoria.

Ownership
The airfield is owned and operated by Mission Aviation Fellowship (MAF), an international Christian humanitarian relief and development organisation. In the mid-2010s, the Christian engineering charity Engineering Ministries International (EMI) redeveloped the office building of the airfield. The new office building became the headquarters of both MAF Uganda and EMI East Africa.

Operations
Kajjansi Airfield is also the operations base for 
Kampala Aeroclub and Flight Training Centre (KAFTC). The company operates scheduled and charter tours to three of Uganda's national parks; Murchison Falls National Park, Queen Elizabeth National Park and Bwindi National Park.

The same company maintains an ICAO-recognized flight-training school that trains, tests and awards private pilots licenses. The school is sometimes referred to as Kajjansi Flying School. KAFTC also operates an aircraft maintenance facility at this airport, under the name of Kampala Aero Maintenance.

Other considerations
Kajjansi Airfield is also the operations base for Pangea Aviation Academy, a flight instructions academy that focuses on training pilots destined for service with the Government of Uganda, including in the UPDF Air Force, the Uganda Police Air Wing, Uganda National Airlines Company and with  General Aviation, in the country and the region.

See also

List of airports in Uganda
Transport in Uganda

References

External links
Mission Aviation Fellowship (Uganda)
Brief Description of Kajjansi Airfield

Airports in Uganda
Wakiso District